Alireza Cheraghali (born 6 January 1997) is an Iranian footballer who plays as a midfielder for Aluminium Arak in the Persian Gulf Pro League.

Club career

Gostaresh Foulad
He made his debut for Gostaresh Foulad (currently name: Machine Sazi) in first fixtures of 2017–18 Iran Pro League against Pars Jonoubi Jam while he substituted in for Ahmad Zendehrouh.

Club career statistics

References

1997 births
Living people
Iranian footballers
Zob Ahan Esfahan F.C. players
Gostaresh Foulad F.C. players
Machine Sazi F.C. players
Association football midfielders